The 1985 Eastern Illinois Panthers football team represented Eastern Illinois University as a member of the Gateway Collegiate Athletic Conference (GCAC) during the 1985 NCAA Division I-AA football season. Led by third-year head coach Al Molde, the Panthers compiled an overall record of 6–5 with a mark of 2–3 in conference play, tying for third place in the GCAC. Eastern Illinois played their home games at O'Brien Stadium in Charleston, Illinois.

Schedule

Roster

References

Eastern Illinois
Eastern Illinois Panthers football seasons
Eastern Illinois Panthers football